The R183 road is a regional road in the Republic of Ireland, linking Clones to Castleblayney in County Monaghan.

Route
West to east, the route starts as the A34 in County Fermanagh in Northern Ireland, on the western edge of Clones. In the town it crosses the N54. It continues eastwards through Newbliss and Ballybay before passing under the N2 near Castleblayney.

From the west of the R183, the A34 runs to Maguiresbridge, where it joins the A4.

See also
Roads in Ireland
National primary road
National secondary road

References

Regional roads in the Republic of Ireland
Roads in County Monaghan